Alfred Teggin (22 October 1860 – 23 July 1941) was a rugby union footballer, and cricketer of the 1880s. He played representative level rugby union (RU) for England, and at club level for Broughton Rangers, as a forward, e.g. front row, lock, or back row, and county level cricket for Lancashire County Cricket Club.

Background
Alfred Teggin was born in Broughton, Lancashire, and he died aged 80 in Cleveleys, Lancashire.

Playing career

Domestic career 
Teggin played his club rugby for Broughton Rangers, and played county rugby for Lancashire. At the time Broughton Rangers played rugby union, but in 1895 they ceded from the Rugby Football Union, that governed the sport in England, and helped found the Northern Union. This eventually developed into the separate sport of rugby league.

International honours
Alfred Teggin won caps for England while at Broughton Rangers in 1884 against Ireland, in 1885 against Wales, in 1886 against Ireland, and Scotland, and in 1887 against Ireland, and Scotland.

In the early years of rugby football the goal was to score goals, and a try had zero value, but it provided the opportunity to try at goal, and convert the try to a goal with an unopposed kick at the goal posts. The point values of both the try and goal have varied over time, and in the early years footballers could "score" a try, without scoring any points.

Cricketing career
Alfred Teggin played six first-class matches for Lancashire in the 1886 English cricket season.

Genealogical information
Alfred Teggin's marriage to Clara Louisa (née Unsworth) was registered during October–December 1892 in Chorlton district.

References

External links
Search for "Teggin" at rugbyleagueproject.org

1860 births
1941 deaths
Broughton Rangers players
England international rugby union players
English cricketers
English rugby union players
Lancashire cricketers
People from Broughton, Greater Manchester
Rugby union forwards
Rugby union players from Salford